Ralph Michael Gagliano  (born October 8, 1946) is an American former professional baseball player. An infielder by trade, he appeared in one Major League Baseball game for the Cleveland Indians on September 21, 1965, during which he recorded no at-bats. He has no "official" fielding position since he entered the game as a pinch-runner. He is the brother of Phil Gagliano.

Gagliano entered his only MLB game in the ninth inning of a 9–4 loss to Mel Stottlemyre and the New York Yankees at Yankee Stadium. With one out, Cleveland shortstop Larry Brown hit an infield single to third base and  Gagliano pinch ran for him. The next batter, Richie Scheinblum, grounded into a force play, second baseman Bobby Richardson to shortstop Bobby Murcer, and Gagliano was retired. Although that was the only game Gagliano appeared in at the Major League level, he played in 311 games over four years (1964, 1966, 1970–1971) in minor league baseball, mostly as a shortstop.

His career was interrupted by three years military service as a veteran of the Vietnam War.

References

External links

1946 births
Living people
American military personnel of the Vietnam War
Baseball players from Memphis, Tennessee
Baseball shortstops
Cleveland Indians players
Dubuque Packers players
Jacksonville Suns players
Reno Silver Sox players